Theodore Paul "Ted" Radke (born 3 November 1958) is a former Australian politician.

He was born at Beaudesert and worked as a teacher at TAFE colleges. His qualifications included an Associate Diploma in Rural Techniques (Horticulture), a Bachelor of Applied Science (Oenology), a Graduate Diploma in Business Administration (Queensland University of Technology, and a Graduate Diploma in Adult and Vocational Education (Griffith University). He joined the Liberal Party in 1985. After an unsuccessful run for Cunningham in 1992, he was elected to the Queensland Legislative Assembly as the member for Greenslopes in 1995. He lost his seat in 1998.

References

1958 births
Living people
Liberal Party of Australia members of the Parliament of Queensland
Members of the Queensland Legislative Assembly
Queensland University of Technology alumni
Griffith University alumni
20th-century Australian people
21st-century Australian people